Skyrim modding refers to the community-made modifications for the 2011 fantasy role-playing video game The Elder Scrolls V: Skyrim. One of the most modded video games of all time, it has nearly 70,000 mod submissions on Nexus Mods and 28,000 in the Steam Workshop. Many of these mods were created for utility reasons, patching numerous bugs left in the game by Bethesda Softworks, while also improving the game's usability and character movement. Other mods add new quests and characters, or update the game's graphics and animations. As the vanilla game has a reputation for outdated mechanics, it is common for players to mod Skyrim even prior to their first playthrough.

Traditionally, Skyrim mods have been largely free to download. Valve Corporation walked back its attempts to add paid mods to Skyrim, following backlash from fans. These mods made their way to the Xbox One and PlayStation 4 with the release of Skyrim Special Edition. Fans were also able to create an unofficial modding scene for the Nintendo Switch.

Popular mods 
Some of the most basic and commonly used mods are the Unofficial Skyrim Patches, which simply address "a huge amount of bugs the official patches don't". One exists for both the main game and the official High Resolution textures patch. SkyUI, which completely redesigns the game's menu screen to make it easier to use, as well as providing menu systems for other mods, is also a popular and highly recommended mod. Other "essential" mods include A Quality World Map, which makes the game's map screen higher-resolution or enables replacement with a paper map, and Realistic Humanoid Movement Speed, which adjusts the player's movement speed to make walking faster and running slower.

Multiple mods were introduced to address the game's Paarthurnax quest, in which the Dragonborn is forced to kill allied NPC dragon Paarthurnax by Delphine, Grandmaster of the Blades, causing controversy over the lack of a choice to spare him despite his prominent role in aiding the Dragonborn. The Paarthurnax Dilemma added the option to force Delphine to stand down, while the later Paarthurnax – Quest Expansion used existing lines to expand the quest and make it sensible from both the Blades' and Paarthurnax's point of view, as well as add the option to spare the dragon.

Many Skyrim mods add new content to the game. The Falskaar mod contains a DLC-length adventure with 26 new quests in a new continent, and was created as a job application; its creator was later hired by Bungie. The Beyond Skyrim: Bruma mod, released in July 2017, adds the county of Bruma from The Elder Scrolls IV: Oblivion and several new quests to the game. 

Skyrim is noted to have an active adult modding scene centered around the website LoversLab, a 1.5 million member "massive sex mod community". Its owner, Ashal, created a mod template for the game known as SexLabs that enabled the creation of adult-themed mods by providing a "foundation of thousands of animations and basic game functions". While largely within the bounds of typical erotica, the mods also include numerous kinks, such as BDSM, with some containing a meaningful story. Many of these modders remain anonymous, as "expressing sexuality in public or in the media beyond holding hands and kisses" remains largely taboo. The site's loose policies also allow controversial and disturbing content, although mods containing pedophilia are strictly banned.

Total conversions 
Several projects have sought to construct new games using Skyrim as a base. Enderal, a sequel to the Oblivion mod Nehrim: At Fate's Edge was an early example of this. It contains a darker story than Skyrim, and was positively received by fans. The Forgotten City is a narrative focused adventure which originated as a mod in 2015, before being remade as a standalone title and changed to an Ancient Roman aesthetic. The final version of the game uses the Unreal Engine and was released for PC and Nintendo Switch in 2021.

Creation Club 

In 2017, Bethesda announced the Creation Club, a storefront for Fallout 4 and Skyrim in which players paid for new content, some of which was created by fans who were compensated by Bethesda for their work. This was compared by some critics to "paid mods", although Bethesda did not characterize them as such to avoid backlash. Skyrim Anniversary Edition was released in November 2021, containing 48 previously released Creation Club items as well as 26 new Creation Club items.

Controversy 
In 2015, Valve Corporation announced a paid mods feature for Steam, with particular emphasis being placed on Skyrim mods. This led to a "huge backlash", as well as a petition that gained more than 130,000 signatures. Parodic Skyrim mods were even created to protest the decision, such as "'Beth the Beggar,' a character that will sit around your game and ask for money 'for no reason'". A week later, Valve reversed the decision, stating that "stepping into an established, years old modding community in Skyrim was probably not the right place to start iterating".

Another controversy involving Skyrim mods occurred in 2021, in which Nexus Mods stated that they would no longer allow older mods to be removed from their website, following a 30-day grace period, in order to prevent problems with the Collections feature, which allows for batch downloading of mods. This caused a backlash due to modders losing control of their work, which led to many of them leaving Nexus Mods for other sites prior to the grace period ending. Arthmoor, one of the game's most popular modders, and the creator of Live another Life, Open Cities Skyrim, and The Paarthurnax Dilemma, moved to the site AFK Mods instead, arguing that a modder had a legal right to delete their content.

See also 
 The Elder Scrolls Renewal Project – a volunteer-led remaster of Skyrim predecessors, Morrowind (Skywind), and Oblivion (Skyblivion), in the Skyrim engine
SureAI - German team of modders who have created several total conversion mods of The Elder Scrolls and Fallout series

References

Further reading